Michael Stewart Gordon Walker (born 28 November 1945) is a Welsh former footballer and manager. After starting his career at Reading, Walker played as a goalkeeper in the Football League for five clubs, most notably Watford and Colchester United. He later managed Colchester, Norwich City, Everton and APOEL. In 2010, he was inducted into the Colchester United Football Club Hall of Fame.

Walker represented Wales at under-23 level on four occasions. His son Ian, also a goalkeeper, later played for England's senior team.

Playing career
Colwyn Bay-born Walker started his playing career as a goalkeeper with Reading in January 1963. He joined Shrewsbury Town in June 1964 and also played for York City, Watford, Charlton Athletic and most notably Colchester United, for whom he made 363 league appearances. Perhaps the most memorable moment in Walker's playing career came when lower division Watford knocked Bill Shankly's Liverpool out of the FA Cup in February 1970, in what was considered to be a major cup upset and a result, and which convinced Shankly of the need to dismantle his ageing side and begin building a new team.

Walker was inducted into the Colchester United Hall of Fame in the 2009–10 season, in recognition for his service to the club as a player and manager. Also inducted that season was Walker's former Watford and Colchester teammate Mick Packer.

Managerial career
Walker had a brief spell in charge of Colchester United in 1986 but was sacked in 1987 whilst top of the league. He then took charge of the Norwich City reserve team in 1987. On 1 June 1992, he was promoted to the position of manager at Carrow Road and gave Norwich their highest-ever league finish in the new FA Premier League where they finished third and qualified for the 1993/94 UEFA Cup — the first time they had qualified for European competition (Norwich had technically qualified three times for the UEFA Cup, but were unable to enter due to the ban on English clubs imposed after the 1985 Heysel Disaster). Norwich achieved a famous victory over FC Bayern Munich in the UEFA Cup Second Round before being knocked out by the eventual winners, Internazionale. Due to his notable achievements at a relatively small club such as Norwich, Walker was felt by many commentators at this time to be one of the most promising new managers in English football, and he was praised for the positive, attack-minded passing game played by his Norwich side.

Walker quit Norwich in January 1994, following a long running feud with Chairman Robert Chase (mainly centring on Chase's habit of selling off the club's key players without consulting his manager first - for example Robert Fleck to Chelsea just after Walker's appointment), to become manager of Everton, with Everton having to pay substantial compensation to Norwich to secure his services. Walker failed, however, to meet the high expectations of a bigger club. Although Walker oversaw an extraordinary last day escape from relegation with Everton securing a 3–2 home victory over Wimbledon (Everton had been 2-0 down, and 2-1 down at half time), Everton made a disastrous start to the 1994/95 season, failing to win a single league game until November. With Everton bottom of the table and having made their worst start to a league season, Walker was sacked having spent just ten months in charge and recording only six league wins, leaving him with the worst record of any post-war Everton manager. Walker was nicknamed the 'Silver Fox' during his time at Goodison. However, there were a few positive aspects of his reign at the club. They included the signing of Anders Limpar in March 1994, the gamble on Daniel Amokachi and the decision to bring the controversial Rangers striker Duncan Ferguson to Everton on loan, a gamble which ultimately paid off after Walker's departure with Joe Royle signing the Scot on a permanent basis.

After Walker's dismissal, Everton went on that season not only to avoid relegation, but also to win the FA Cup under Royle.

Walker did not return to football until taking over again at Norwich on 21 June 1996, by which time the Canaries had been relegated to Division One. He remained in charge for two seasons but was sacked as manager after they failed to return to the Premiership. Since leaving Norwich, Walker has had a spell managing APOEL in Cyprus, where he resides to this day.

Managerial statistics

Personal life
Walker is the father of Ian Walker, former England goalkeeper. He also has a son, David and a daughter, Ursula. His wife and the mother of his children, Jacqueline "Jackie" Walker, died on 3 November 1997 after a long battle against cancer.

Honours

Player
Watford
Football League Third Division: 1968–69

Individual
Colchester United Player of the Year: 1979–80, 1980–81, 1982–83

Manager
Individual
Premier League Manager of the Month: October 1993

References

External links

1945 births
Living people
Colchester United F.C. managers
Association football goalkeepers
Welsh football managers
Welsh expatriate football managers
Welsh footballers
Wales under-23 international footballers
Expatriate football managers in Cyprus
Welsh expatriate sportspeople in Cyprus
Everton F.C. managers
Premier League managers
Norwich City F.C. managers
Reading F.C. players
Shrewsbury Town F.C. players
York City F.C. players
Watford F.C. players
Charlton Athletic F.C. players
Colchester United F.C. players
English Football League players
People from Colwyn Bay
Sportspeople from Conwy County Borough
APOEL FC managers